Mikhail Naumovich Epstein (also transliterated Epshtein; ; born 21 April 1950) is a Russian-American literary scholar and essayist who is the Samuel Candler Dobbs Professor of Cultural Theory and Russian Literature at Emory University, Atlanta, US. He moved there from Moscow, USSR, in 1990. He has also worked as a professor of Russian and Cultural Theory at Durham University, UK, from 2012 to 2015, where he was the founder and Director of the Centre for Humanities Innovation at Durham University.

His areas of specialization include postmodernism, cultural and literary theory; the history of Russian literature and intellectual history; contemporary philosophical and religious thought, and ideas and electronic media. Epstein is also an expert on Russian philosophy of the 19th and 20th centuries and on thinkers like Nikolai Berdyaev. He writes essays on cultural, social, ethical and international issues.

Biography
Epstein was born in Moscow, USSR, and is of Jewish heritage. He graduated from the Philological faculty of Moscow State University in 1972. He has been a member of the Soviet Writers' Union since 1978 and the founder and director of the club "Image and Thought" (1986–1988) and Laboratory of Contemporary Culture in Moscow (1988–89).

He moved to the United States in 1990 and was a fellow of Woodrow Wilson International Center for Scholars (Washington D.C.) in 1990–1991. He joined the faculty of Emory University in 1991.  In 1992, he received a grant from the National Council for Soviet and East European Research (https://nceeer.org/) to work on the history of Russian thought of the late Soviet period. He created ] and wrote on InteLnet (Intellectual network, 1995) and a number of other interdisciplinary web sites in the humanities.

One of his major continuing projects is "On the Future of the Humanities: Paradigmatic Shifts and Emerging Concepts", on which he worked as an inaugural senior fellow at Emory University, (2002–03) and as a fellow at the Institute of Advanced Study at Durham University, England (2011). He had visiting professor appointments at Wesleyan University (1990) and University of Oregon at Eugene, Oregon (2002).

Mikhail Epstein has won national and international prizes, including the Andrei Bely Prize (St. Petersburg, 1991); The Social Innovations Award 1995 from the Institute for Social Inventions in London for his electronic Bank of New Ideas; the International Essay Contest set up by Lettre International and Weimar – Cultural City of Europe 1999; and the Liberty Prize, awarded for his outstanding contribution in the development of Russian-American cultural connections (New York, 2000).

Ideas and terms

In the realm of aesthetics, Epstein, together with poet and conceptual artist Dmitry Prigov, is credited with introducing the concept of "new sincerity" (novaia iskrennost) as a response to the dominant sense of absurdity in late Soviet and post-Soviet culture. In Epstein's words, "Postconceptualism, or the New Sincerity, is an experiment in resuscitating 'fallen', dead languages with a renewed pathos of love, sentimentality, and enthusiasm".

In his exploration of contemporary spirituality, Epstein focuses on the concept of "post-atheism," or "minimal [or poor] religion", discussed in particular in his correspondence with the Protestant thinker Thomas Altizer and extensively examined in Charles Taylor's book "The Secular Age" (2007) that refers to Epstein's work.

Bibliography

In library catalogs, publications are listed under the names: Mikhail Epstein, Mikhail Epshtein, and Michail Epstein. He has published 37 books in English and Russian, and 19 books have been into German, Serbo-Croatian, Slovenian, Hungarian, Lithuanian, Ukrainian, and Korean. Articles and essays have been translated and published in 23 languages. Full list of publications includes more than 700 items.

Books in English 
Ideas Against Ideocracy: Non-Marxist Thought of the Late Soviet Period (1953–1991). New York and London: Bloomsbury Academic, 2021, 264 pp.   https://www.bloomsbury.com/us/ideas-against-ideocracy-9781501350597/
The Phoenix of Philosophy: Russian Thought of the Late Soviet Period (1953–1991). New York and London: Bloomsbury Academic, 2019, 300 pp. 
 A Philosophy of the Possible: Modalities in Thought and Culture. Boston, Leiden et al.: Brill Academic Publishers, 2019, 365 pp.  
 The Irony of the Ideal: Paradoxes of Russian Literature. Boston: Academic Studies Press, 2017 
  Russian Postmodernism: New Perspectives on Post-Soviet Culture (with Alexander Genis and Slobodanka Vladiv-Glover). New and revised edition. New York, Oxford: Berghahn Books, 2016, 578 pp.(of 28 chapters, 19 are written by this author). 
 The Transformative Humanities: A Manifesto. New York–London: Bloomsbury Academic, 2012, 318 pp.
 PreDictionary. Berkeley: Atelos, 2011, 155 pp. (paperback). 
 Russian Spirituality and the Secularization of Culture. New York: FrancTireur-USA, 2011, 135 pp.  
 Cries in the New Wilderness: From the Files of the Moscow Institute of Atheism. Trans. and intr. by Eve Adler. Philadelphia: Paul Dry Books, 2002, 236 pp. (hardcover and paperback). 
 Transcultural Experiments: Russian and American Models of Creative Communication (with Ellen Berry). New York: St. Martin's Press (Scholarly and Reference Division), 1999, 340 pp. (of 23 chapters in this book, 16 are written by this author). 
 After the Future: The Paradoxes of Postmodernism and Contemporary Russian Culture, Amherst: The University of Massachusetts Press, 1995, 392 pp. Hardcover and paperback editions. Electronic edition, Boulder, Colo.: NetLibrary, Inc., 2000. 
 Relativistic Patterns in Totalitarian Thinking: An Inquiry into the Language of Soviet Ideology. Kennan Institute for Advanced Russian Studies, Occasional Paper, #243. Washington: Woodrow Wilson International Center for Scholars, 1991,94 pp.

Books in English and Russian
 Amerussia: Selected essays. / Amerossiia. Izbrannaia esseistika. (parallel texts in English and Russian).  Moscow: Serebrianye niti,  2007, 504 pp.
 The Constructive Potential of the Humanities. / Konstruktivnyi potential gumanitarnykh nauk. Moscow, Russian State University of the Humanities, 2006,  74 pp.

Books in Russian
Budushchee gumanitarnykh nauk: Tekhnogumanizm, kreatorika, erotologiia, elektronnaia filologiia i drugie nauki XXI veka. (The Future of the Humanities: Technohumanism, Creatorics, Erotology, Digital Philology and Other Disciplines of the XXI c.). Moscow: Ripol–klassik, 2019, 240 pp.  
 Proektivnyi slovar' gumanitarnykh nauk (The Projective Dictionary of Humanistic Disciplines) (the author of all 440 entries in 14 thematic rubrics). Moscow: Novoe literaturnoe obozrenie, 2017,  616 pp.  
 Liubov'  (Love). Moscow: Ripol Klassik, the series "Philosophy of Life," 2018, 568 pp. 
 Ot znania k tvorchestvu. Kak gumanitarnye nauki mogut izmeniat' mir (From Knowledge to Creativity: How the Humanities Can Change the World). Moscow–S.–Petersburg, izd. Tsentr gumanitarnykh initsiativ (series Humanitas), 2016, 480 pp.  
 Poeziia i sverkhpoeziia: O mnogoobrazii tvorcheskikh mirov (Poetry and Superpoetry: On the Variety of Creative Worlds). S.–Petersburg: Azbuka (a volume in the series Cultural Code), 2016,  478 pp.    
 Ironia Ideala. Paradoksy russkoi literatury. (The Irony of the Ideal: Paradoxes of Russian Literature). Moscow: Novoe literaturnoe obozrenie, 2015, 384 pp.  
 Religia posle ateizma: Novye vozmozhnosti teologii (Religion after Atheism: New Possibilities for Theology). Moscow: AST-Press, 2013, 415 pp. 
 Slovo i molchanie. Metafizika russkoi literatury (Word and Silence: The Metaphysics of Russian Literature). Moscow: Vysshaia shkola, 2006, 550 pp.
 Filosofiia tela  (Philosophy of the Body).  St.-Petersburg: Aleteia, 2006,  194 pp.
 Znak probela: O budushchem gumanitarnykh nauk (Mapping Blank Spaces: On the Future of the Humanities). Moscow: Novoe literaturnoe obozrenie, 2004, 864 pp.
 Proektivnyi filosofskii slovar'. Novye terminy i poniatiia (A Projective Philosophical Dictionary. New Terms and Concepts).  St.-Petersburg: Aleteia, 2003, 512 pp. (coeditor with G. L. Tulchinsky and the author of the Preface and of 90 entries out of overall 165).
 Filosofiia vozmozhnogo. Modal'nosti v myshlenii i kul'ture (The Philosophy of the Possible: The Modalities in Thought and Culture). St.-Petersburg: Aleteia, 2001, 334 pp.
  Postmodern v Rossii: literatura i teoriia (The Postmodern in Russia: Literature and Theory). Moscow: LIA Elinina, 2000, 370 pp. Moscow: Vysshaia shkola, 2005, 495 pp.
  Vera i obraz. Religioznoe bessoznatel'noe v russkoi kul'ture XX veka (Faith and Image: The Religious Unconscious in Twentieth Century Russian Culture), Tenafly (New Jersey): Hermitage Publishers, 1994, 270 pp.
 'Priroda, mir, tainik vselennoi. . .' Sistema peizazhnykh obrazov v russkoi poezii ('Nature, the World, the Mystery of the Universe...': The System of Landscape Images in Russian Poetry). Moscow: Vysshaia Shkola [the central university press of Russia], 1990, 304 pp. Samara: Bakhrakh-M, 2007, 352 pp.
 Paradoksy novizny. O literaturnom razvitii XIX-XX vekov (The Paradoxes of Innovation: On the Development of Literature in the 19th and 20th Centuries). Moscow: Sovetskii Pisatel', 1988, 4l6 pp.
 Entsiklopedia iunosti (Encyclopedia of Youth), with Sergei Iourienen. Moscow: Eksmo, 2017, 590 pp. 
 Ot sovka k bobku. Politika na grani groteska (From Homo Soveticus to Dostoevsky's Bobok Character. Politics on the Edge of Grotesque). 2nd, revised and expanded edition. Kiev. Dukh i Litera, 2016, 312 pp. 
  Prosto proza (Just the Prose). New York: FrancTireurUSA, 2016, 194 pp.
 Kleikie listochki: Mysli vrazbros i vopreki. (Leaves in Bud: Scattered Untimely Reflections). Moscow: ArsisBooks, 2014, 266 pp.  
 Ottsovstvo: Roman–dnevnik. Fatherhood: A Novel–Diary. Moscow, Nikea, 2014, 320 pp. (3rd revised edition). Previous editions: Ottsovstvo (An Essay), Tenafly (New Jersey): Hermitage Publishers, 1992, 160 pp.; Ottsovstvo. Metafizicheskii dnevnik (Fatherhood. A Metaphysical Journal); 2nd revised edition, St.-Petersburg: Aletheia, 2003, 248 pp.
 Sola Amore: Liubov' v piati izmereniiakh (Solo Amore: Love in Five Dimensions). Moscow: Eksmo, 2011, 492 pp.
 Katalog (Catalogue), with Ilya Kabakov. Vologda: Library of Moscow Conceptualism published by German Titov, 2010, 344 pp.
 Vse esse, v 2 tt., t. 1. V Rossii, 1970-e – 1980-e;  t. 2. Iz Ameriki, 1990-e-2000-e (All Essays, or All is Essay), in 2 volumes: vol. 1. In Russia, 1970s–1980s; vol. 2. From America, 1990s–2000s. Ekaterinburg: U-Faktoriia, 2005, 544 pp. + 704 pp.
 Bog detalei. Narodnaia dusha i chastnaia zhizn' v Rossii na iskhode imperii (A Deity of Details: The Public Soul and Private Life at the Twilight of the Russian Empire). New York:  Slovo/Word, 1997, 248 pp. 2nd, revised and expanded edition. Moscow: LIA Elinina, 1998, 240 pp.
 Na granitsakh kul'tur. Rossiiskoe – amerikanskoe – sovetskoe (On the Borders of Cultures: Russian – American – Soviet). New York, Slovo/Word, 1995, 343 pp.
 Novoe sektantstvo: tipy religiozno-filosofskikh umonastroenii v Rossii, 1970-80-e gody (New Sectarianism: The Varieties of Religious-Philosophical Consciousness in Russia, the 1970s–1980s). 3rd revised and expanded edition. Samara: Bakhrakh-M, 2005, 255 pp. 
 Velikaia Sov'. Filosofsko-mifologicheskii ocherk (Great Sov'. A Philosophical-Mythological Essay). New York: Word/Slovo, 1994, 175 pp.
Novoe v klassike. Derzhavin, Pushkin, Blok v sovremennom vospriiatii (The Classics Renovated: Derzhavin, Pushkin, and Blok in Contemporary Perception). Moscow: Znanie, 1982, 40 pp.

Essays

References

External links
Home page
An article on M. Epstein in the Chronicle of Higher Education (Nov. 2002)
Mikhail Epstein's works on the web:
In English: 
In Russian: 
 Dagnino, Arianna. Epstein, Mikhail (2012). The Transformative Humanities: A Manifesto. London: Bloomsbury. A Review. Rhizomes, Issue 28, 2015
 http://rhizomes.net/issue28/dagnino.html

1950 births
20th-century male writers
Academics of Durham University
American people of Russian-Jewish descent
Emory University faculty
Jewish American writers
Living people
Russian philosophers
Semioticians
Soviet literary historians
Soviet male writers
Writers from Moscow
Jewish Ukrainian social scientists